National Tertiary Route 312, or just Route 312 (or ) is a National Road Route of Costa Rica, located in the San José province.

Description
In San José province the route covers Aserrí canton (Aserrí district).

References

Highways in Costa Rica